Late Dates is a 1980 Soviet melodrama directed by Vladimir Grigoryev.

Plot 
The film tells about a village girl who moves to Leningrad, graduates from the institute with the difference, defends her thesis, but was never able to achieve success in her personal life.

Cast 
 Larisa Malevannaya as Vera
 Yuri Platonov as Nikolai
 Yekaterina Vasilyeva as Doctor
 Sergey Nikonenko as Kukushkin
 Alina Olkhovaya as Anna
 Aleksandr Chaban as Mikhail
 Galina Simonova as Lena (as Galina Shchepetnova)
 Pyotr Shelokhonov as Lena's father
 Oleg Palmov as Makarov
 Viktor Gogolev

References

External links 
 

1980 films
1980s Russian-language films
Soviet romantic comedy-drama films